Margaret Lake could refer to:

 Lake Margaret (Tasmania), a lake in Australia
 Margaret Lake, Alberta, location of the Margaret Lake Airport
 Margaret Lake, Manitoba, a lake on the Winnipeg River
 Margaret Lake (Glacier County, Montana)
 Margaret Lake (Kittitas County, Washington)

People
 Margaret Lake, real name of astrologer Mystic Meg (1942–2023)
 Maʻiki Aiu Lake (1925–1984), a hula dancer and influential figure in the second Hawaiian Renaissance